Emmanuel Tarpin (born 1992) is a French contemporary jewelry designer. Since 2018, he founded his self-titled atelier for high-end jewelry. He lives in Paris.

Biography 
Emmanuel Tarpin was born in 1992 in Annecy, Haute-Savoie, France. In childhood he practiced sculpture. Tarpin is openly queer. 

He graduated from the Geneva University of Art and Design in 2014. After graduation he worked on the jewelry bench at Van Cleef & Arpels, and remained there for three years. In 2018, he founded his own atelier for high-end jewelry. In 2019, he made a capsule collection for Swiss luxury jeweler De Grisogono.

In 2019, he won the Town & Country Jewelry Award for "Breakthrough Designer of the Year". Celebrities that have worn his work include Mandy Moore, and Rihanna. Prices for Tarpin’s jewelry in 2019 started around 15,000 euros ($16,525 USD).

References 

1992 births

Living people
French jewellery designers
French jewellers
Geneva University of Art and Design alumni
People from Annecy
Swiss LGBT artists